Lake Tillery is a reservoir between Falls Reservoir and Blewett Falls Lake in the Uwharrie Lakes Region of North Carolina. It is entirely within Stanly County and Montgomery County, NC. The lake was created by impounding the Pee Dee River, which is created by the confluence of the Yadkin River and the Uwharrie River several miles to the north. Norwood, NC in neighboring Stanly County uses as its town motto "Gateway to Lake Tillery".

James B. Garrison Bridge
The James B. Garrison Bridge is the only crossing of the Pee-Dee-Yadkin River between Badin Lake and Norwood. The bridge carries traffic on North Carolina Highway 24/27/73 across the river and Lake Tillery from Stanly County to Montgomery County. Swift Island Bridge, the water's old crossing parallels the newer two-lane bridge which accompanies it; the older bridge is a narrow one-lane concrete arch bridge built in 1922.

In the 1920s when it was discovered that the  lake to be impounded behind the new dam would cover the original reinforced concrete and steel bridge, Carolina Power & Light (now Progress Energy Inc), owner of the new dam, turned it over to the U.S. military for training purposes.  First, engineers were unable to collapse the bridge by overloading it with dead weight. Next, the Army Air Corp dropped bombs on it. Later, an artillery division targeted it with cannon fire.  It finally took a ton of TNT to bring the bridge down.

Tillery Dam 

Tillery Dam was constructed in 1928 as an 87-megawatt hydroelectric facility owned and operated by Carolina Power, and now owned by Duke Energy.

In 2008, in the context of its state licensing, the Southern Environmental Law Center challenged the power company's proposed minimum water flows in the  stretch between Tillery Dam and Blewett Dam. The SELC asserted that the proposed levels would violate the state's water quality standards, damage aquatic wildlife, and disrupt boating.

Gallery

References 

Reservoirs in North Carolina
Protected areas of Stanly County, North Carolina
Protected areas of Montgomery County, North Carolina
Dams in North Carolina
Duke Energy dams
Bodies of water of Montgomery County, North Carolina
Bodies of water of Stanly County, North Carolina